Cannibalism (aka Cannibalism: The Last Supper)  is a 2002 pornographic horror film written and directed by Lizzy Borden.

Plot 
A deranged Satanic cult lures in couples and lone women so they can rape, butcher, and devour them.

Cast 

 Alexandra Quinn
 Lizzy Borden
 Mickey G.
 Mr. Pete
 Rod Fontana

Reception 
Paul Fishbein, president of Adult Video News, allegedly referred to Cannibalism and the rest of the Extreme Associates library as "horrible, unwatchable, disgusting, aberrant movies". Recarts Movies Erotica denounced film as "nothing shocking", while a score of 7.05 out of 10.00 was awarded by Cyberspace Adult Video Reviews, which criticized the effects and regarded the attempts at horror as "silly". The Encyclopedia of Cannibal Movies wrote that Cannibalism was "the most overtly cannibalistic 'adult' movie made to date" and "definitely not the sort of porn you see every day". The Village Voice described the film as "cartoonish" but admitted "scarily enough, gore and porn make perfect bedfellows". Adult Industry News found Cannibalism both erotic and disgusting, and called it "a real must see for the forced sex crowd, fake snuff crowd, and gross out crowd".

References

External links
 
 
 

Films about Satanism
2002 films
American splatter films
Films about rape
2002 horror films
Films about cannibalism
2000s pornographic films
Pornographic horror films
2002 direct-to-video films
American pornographic films
Direct-to-video horror films
Films shot in Los Angeles
Extreme Associates
2000s English-language films
2000s American films